Glenrose Xaba (born 31 December 1994) is a South African long-distance runner. She competed in the senior women's race at the 2019 IAAF World Cross Country Championships held in Aarhus, Denmark, where she finished in 67th place.

Career 

She competed in the junior women's race at the 2013 IAAF World Cross Country Championships held in Bydgoszcz, Poland.

In 2015, she won the silver medal in the women's 10,000 metres at the South African Athletics Championships held in Stellenbosch, South Africa. She also won the bronze medal in the women's 5000 metres event. In 2016, she competed in the women's 10,000 metres event at the African Championships in Athletics held in Durban, South Africa.

In 2017, she competed in the senior women's race at the IAAF World Cross Country Championships held in Kampala, Uganda. She finished in 64th place. In 2018, she competed in the senior women's race at the African Cross Country Championships held in Chlef, Algeria.

She competed in the women's half marathon at the 2020 World Athletics Half Marathon Championships held in Gdynia, Poland.

She was not able to qualify for the 2020 Summer Olympics in Tokyo, Japan due to injury.

Achievements 

All information taken from World Athletics profile.

International competitions

National titles
 South African Championships
 10,000 m: 2016, 2017, 2019, 2021, 2022

 South African Road Running Championships
 10 km: 2019

 South African U23 Championships
 5,000 m: 2015, 2016
 10,000 m: 2015, 2016

References

External links 
 

Living people
1994 births
Place of birth missing (living people)
South African female long-distance runners
South African female cross country runners
South African Athletics Championships winners
20th-century South African women
21st-century South African women